Sonipat district is one of the 22 districts of Haryana state in North India. Sonipat town is the district headquarters. It is a part of National Capital Region. It is bordered by Delhi, Panipat, Rohtak, Jind, Jhajjar and Baghpat (Uttar Pradesh).

The district borders union territory of Delhi in south, Panipat District in the north, Jind District in the north-west, Uttar Pradesh state in the east with the Yamuna River acting as a border and Rohtak District in the west.

Origin of name
The district is named after its administrative headquarters, Sonipat. Sonipat was earlier known as Sonprastha, which later became Swarnprastha (Golden City), which is derived from two Sanskrit words, Svarna (Gold) and Prastha (Place). Over a period of time, the classical name Swarnprastha's pronunciation degraded into Svarnpat, and then to its current form, Sonipat. The earliest reference of this city comes in the historical book of Mahabharata, and at that time, it was one of the five villages demanded by the Pandavas in lieu of the kingdom of Hastinapur.

History
This district was carved out of the erstwhile Rohtak district on 22 December 1972 with Sonipat as its headquarters.

Battle of Sonipat
The one and only battle fought in Sonipat was Battle of Sonipat. Dahiya Jats of Khanda, Sonipat village witnessed the Battle of Sonipat against Mughals and won the battle under the military leadership of Banda Singh Bahadur.

Geography
Broadly speaking, the entire district is a part of the Punjab plain, but the area is not level in some parts. Over most of the district, the soil is fine loam of rich colour. However, some areas have sandy soil and others Kallar. The plain has a gradual slope to the south and east. The district may be roughly divided into three regions: The Khadar, the upland plain and the sandy region.

The Khadar
Along the River Yamuna which is a narrow flood plain ranging from 2 to 4 miles in width and is formed by the river along its course. The Khader plain is 20 to 30 ft. lower adjoining upland plain. The soil is fine clay loam left by the receding floods of the Yamuna. Farmers in the Khadar area cultivate rice and sugar cane. Recently, the farmers have started planting Banana, Pappaya and other fruits trees in this area.

The upland plain
It consists of Sonipat tehsil lying to the west of the Khadar, and is the most extensive of the three regions: The Upland Plain is covered with old alluvium, which if properly irrigated, is highly productive.  There is extensive Farming of crops, oil seeds, horticultural plants, vegetables and flowers in this region. The ridges in Gohana tehsil represent the northernmost extension of the Aravallis.

The sandy region
A much smaller part of the district is covered with soil consisting of sand or sandy loam. Parts of this region have high PH values leading Kallor land.

Administration
The district comprises three sub-divisions: Ganaur, Sonipat, and Gohana.

They are further divided in four tehsils: Ganaur, Sonipat, Kharkhoda and Gohana. The tehsils of Kharkhoda and Sonipat fall under jurisdiction of Sonipat sub division, while tehsils of Ganaur and Gohana fall under the jurisdiction of their respective sub divisions. These are further divided into seven blocks: Ganaur, Sonipat, Rai, Kharkhoda, Gohana, Kathura and Mundlana.

The district comprises 343 villages, out of which 15 are uninhabited.

There are six Vidhan Sabha constituencies in this district, namely, Ganaur, Rai, Kharkhauda, Sonipat, Gohana and Baroda. All of these are part of Sonipat Lok Sabha constituency. The other three Vidhan Sabha constituencies which are part of Sonipat Lok Sabha constituency, namely, Julana, Safidon and Jind are in Jind District

The district comprises a lone municipal corporation, Sonipat, and 3 municipal committees: Ganaur, Gohana and Kharkhoda.

Villages 
The following villages are under the Sonipat district.

 Bidhlan
 Aghwanpur
 Atail
 Bai
 Bajana Kalan
 Bajana Khurd
 Balli Qutabpur
 Baraut
 Bari
 Begah
 Bhagan
 Bhakharpur
 Bhanwar
 Bharet
 Bhogipur
 Bhora Rasulpur
 Bhuri
 Bulandpur
 Chandauli
 Chirsami
 Dabarpur
 Datauli
 Ganaur
 Garhi Kesri
 Ghasoli
 Giaspur
 Gumar
 Jalalabad
 Kailana
 Kherigujar
 Kheritaga
 Khizarpur Ahir
 Khubru
 Lalheri
 Larsoli
 Machhrauli
 Manak Majra
 Miana
 Mohammadpur Majra
 Nayabans
 Pabnera
 Panchi Gujran
 Panchi Jatan
 Patti Barahmnan
 Pipli Khera
 Pogthala
 Purkhas Dhiran
 Purkhas Rathi
 Rajlu
 Rajpur
 Ramnagar
 Rasulpur
 Sanpera
 Sardhana
 Shahpur Taga
 Shamashpur
 Udesipur
 Umedgarh
 Sheikhupura
 Siha Khera(Ravi bhardwaj's village)
 Teha
 Teori
 Zafarpur
 Ahulana
 Gohana
 Nagar
 Barota
 Garhi Sharai Namdar khan
 Garhi Unale Khan
 Lath
 Jauli
 Bidhal
 Tihar
 Bhainswal Kalan Mithan
 Bhaniswal Kalan Bawala
 Giwana
 Aanwali
 Kheri Damkan
 Rabhra
 Moi Hooda
 Puthi
 Bali Barmanan
 Sikanderpur Majra
 Baroda Thuthan
 Khanpur Khurd
 Thaske
 Kathura
 Kahalpa
 Banwasa
 Bhanderi
 Ahulana
 Dhanana
 Rindhana
 Katwal
 kohla
 Madina
 Rukhi
 Chhichhrana
 Chhapra
 Bilbilan
 Riwara
 Jasrana
 Niat
 Mirzapur Kheri
 Anandpur
 Ashrafpur Matindu
 Barona
 Bidhlan
 Chhanauli
 Farmana
 Ferozepur Bangar
 Garhi Sisana
 Gopalpur
 Gorar
 Jataula
 Jharaut
 Jharauti
 Jhinjauli
 Kanwail
 Karhouli
 Katlupur
 Khanda
 Khanda Almaan
 Chhota Khanda
 Naya Khanda
 Kharkhoda
 Kheri Dahiya
 Kundal
 Mandaura
 Mandauri
 Muzzam Nagar
 Nakloi
 Nasirpur Cholka
 Nirthan
 Nizampur Khurd
 Nizampur Majra
 Pahladpur
 Pai
 Pipli
 Rampur
 Ridhad
 Rohna
 Sahoti
 Saidpur
 Sehri
 Silana
 Sisana
 Thana Kalan
 Thana Khurd
 Turakpur
 Ziaudinpur
 Pharmana
 Ridhau
 Abbaspur
 Abdulpur
 Ahmadpur
 Asadpur
 Badshahpur Machchhri
 Bagru
 Bainyapur
 Bakhtawarpur
 Bandepur
 Barauli
 Barwasni
 Basaudi
 Bhadana
 Bhadi
 Bhatana Jafrabad
 Bhatgaon Dungran
 Bhatgoan Malian
 Bhowapur
 Bindhrauli
 Bohla
 Chatiya Aoliya
 Chatiya Deva
 Chhatehra bahadurpur
 Chitana
 Dewru
 Dhaturi
 Dhikki
 Dipalpur
 Dodwa
 Dubheta
 Fatehpur
 Fazilpur
 Garh shahjanpur
 Garhi Bakhtawarpur
 Garhi bala
 Garhi Brahmnan
 Guhna
 Halalpur
 Harsana Kalan
 Harsana khurd
 Hasamabad
 Hasanpur
 Hullaheri
 Hushanyarpur tiharkalan
 Jagdishpur
 Jainpur
 Jaji
 Jamalpur kalan
 Jamalpur khurd
 Jawahri
 Joshi Chauhan
 Kabirpur
 Juan
 Kakroi
 Kalupur
 Kamaspur
 Kami
 karewri
 Khijarpur Jat Majra
 Kilohard
 Kishora
 Kurar Ibrahimpur
 Ladpur
 Lahrara
 Liwan
 Luhari tibba
 Machchhraula
 Mahipur
 Mahla Majra
 Mahlana
 Mahra
 Majri
 Malikpur
 Mahendipur
 Mimarpur
 Mohamdabad
 Mohana
 Moi
 Mukimpur
 Murshadpur
 Murthal
 Nahra
 Nahri
 Naina tatarpur
 Nandnaur
 Nangal Khurd
 Nasirpur Bangar
 Nasirpur Khadar
 Pinana
 Raipur
 Rathdhana
 Rehmana
 Rewli
 Rohat
 Rolad latifpur
 Salarpur Majra
 Salimpur trali
 Salimsar majra
 Sandal Kalan
 Sandal Khurd
 Shadipur
 Shahpur Turk
 Shahzadpur
 Sitawali
 Sonepat Patti Musalman
 Sonepat Patti Jatan
 Sultanpur
 Tajpur
 Tajpur tihar khurd
 Tharu
 Tharya
 Tikaula
 Uldepur
 Bhainswan khurd
 Gudha
 Mahmudpur
 Kailana  Talaka Mahudpur
 Siwanka
 Chhatera
 Ahmadpur Majra
 Gangesar
 Matand
 Jagsi
 Gangana
 Rana Kheri
 Bichpari
 Khandri
 Butana Kundu
 Butana Khetlan
 Issapur Kheri
 Nuran Khera
 Nizampur
 Bhawar
 Gharwal
 Baroda Mor
 Sonipat
 Dahisra
 kundli
 Jakhauli
 Sewli
 Khatkar
 Basantpur
 Badmalik
 Nathupur
 Akbarpur Barota
 Jajal
 Khewra
 Palri khurd
 Garh Mirakpur
 Rai
 Jatheri
 Hansapur
 Jat joshi
 Manoli
 Nangal Kalan
 Atena
 Palri Kalan
 Palra
 Bazidpur Saboli
 Safiabad Pana Paposian
 Janti Kalan
 Janti khurd
 Sersa
 Munirpur
 Pabsara
 Jhundpur
 Asawarpur
 Orangabad
 Patla
 Bahalgarh
 Liwaspur
 Firozpur Khadar
 Pritam pura
 Badkhalsa
 Rasoi
 Kheri Manajat
 Khurampur
 Bharia
 Bakipur
 Safiabad Kheri Manajat
 Khanpur Kalan
 Kakana Bhadri
 Mundlana No. 1
 Mundlana No. 2
 Bhadoti Taluka Mudlana
 Sarsadh
 Busana
 Bhadoti khas
 Bhadoti Taluka Busana
 Jawahra
 Dhurana
 Saragtjal
 Kasanda
 Kasandi
 Shamri Sisan
 Shamri Lochab Bairan
 Chirana
 Shamri Buran
 Gamri
 Kailana Khas
 Lehrara
 Garhi Bindhrauli

Education
The district is one of the major education hubs in India. Apart from a number of schools and colleges, the district is home to many universities. Deenbandhu Chhotu Ram University of Science and Technology in Murthal was founded in 1987, Bhagat Phool Singh Mahila Vishwavidyalaya in Sonipat was founded in 2006 and O. P. Jindal Global University near Rathdhana was founded in 2009. Recently in 2012, National Institute of Food Technology Entrepreneurship and Management, NIFTEM,  a world class institute was founded in Kundli which falls near Delhi border, SRM Institute of Science and Technology Delhi NCR Sonepat in Rajiv Gandhi Education City, Sonipat near Delhi was founded in 2013.

Transport

Sonipat Junction Railway Station is located on the Northern Railways' Ambala-Panipat-Delhi rail route. It lies on one of the most busiest railway line in North India that is Delhi - Chandigarh.. A number of passengers and express trains daily passes through it like Shatabadi Express, Shaan-e-Punjab, Malwa Express, Muri Express, Saryu Yamuna Express, Himalayan Queen, Sachkhand Express, Paschim Express, Kalka Mail, Jammu Mail, Unchahar Express, Amritsar Express, Jhelum Express, Tata Jat Express, Jan Shatabi, Shahid Express etc.
In total, 64+ trains available from Sonipat daily. National Highway 1 and National Highway 71A, NH 334B, NH 44, Western Peripheral Expressway and Eastern Peripheral Expressway pass through this district. Government of India plans to make first Bus Port in the pattern of Airport in Sonipat.

Demographics

According to the 2011 census Sonipat district has a population of 1,450,001, roughly equal to the nation of Gabon or the US state of Hawaii. This gives it a ranking of 338th in India (out of a total of 640). 
Its population growth rate over the decade 2001-2011 was 15.71%. Sonipat has a sex ratio of 853 females for every 1000 males, and a literacy rate of 80.8%. Scheduled Castes make up 18.62% of the population.

Religion

Languages 

At the time of the 2011 Census of India, 66.89% of the population in the district spoke Haryanvi, 30.15% Hindi and 1.24% Punjabi as their first language.

References

External links
Sonipat district official website
Rollpanda - Best Website of Sonipat 
Map of Sonipat

 
1972 establishments in Haryana
Populated places established in 1972